Blind Spot is a 1932 British crime film directed by John Daumery and starring Percy Marmont, Muriel Angelus and Warwick Ward. It was made at Teddington Studios by the British subsidiary of Warner Brothers.

Cast
 Percy Marmont as Holland Janney  
 Muriel Angelus as Marilyn Janney 
 Warwick Ward as Hugh Conway 
 Ivor Barnard as Mull  
 Laura Cowie as Anne Wiltone  
 Mary Jerrold as Mrs. Herriott  
 George Merritt as Inspector Cadbury

References

Bibliography
 Low, Rachael. Filmmaking in 1930s Britain. George Allen & Unwin, 1985.
 Wood, Linda. British Films, 1927-1939. British Film Institute, 1986.

External links

1932 films
British crime films
1932 crime films
Films directed by Jean Daumery
Films set in England
Films shot at Teddington Studios
Warner Bros. films
British black-and-white films
1930s English-language films
1930s British films